Knox's Headquarters State Historic Site, in the town of New Windsor in Orange County, New York, consists of the Georgian house of the Ellison family, built in 1754 by immigrant William Bull of Hamptonburgh, NY, and the grounds around it. The site is located on Old Forge Hill Road, just south of Route 94 east of Vails Gate.

Although most closely associated with Henry Knox, who used it as his headquarters as the Revolutionary War drew to a close in the early 1780s, it was used as a general's headquarters throughout most of the war, by Nathanael Greene and Horatio Gates.

The site was declared a National Historic Landmark in 1972. While owned by the New York State Office of Parks, Recreation and Historic Preservation the Ellison House is administered and operated by the Palisades Interstate Park Commission, like many other state parks and historic sites in the mid and lower Hudson region.

Today, the house can be toured when the site is open. It is used to educate visitors about how 18th-century families such as the Ellisons actually lived. On holidays and special occasions staff dress in reproduction period clothing and give special events. Staff dressed as the 2nd Continental Artillery frequently demonstrate cannon use on the grounds during special events, as Knox was best known for his command of Continental artillery.

The house and its grounds were the setting and subject of the children's haunted-house novel Buried Treasure (1919), by the best-selling children's author Henry Everett McNeil.  The book is illustrated with McNeil's own photographs (made circa 1911 or 1912) of the various buildings and bridge at the Knox site.

The Jane Colden Plant Sanctuary along some of the trails in the nearby woods memorializes America's first female botanist, who also resided in the area.

See also

New Windsor Cantonment State Historic Site
Washington's Headquarters State Historic Site
List of National Historic Landmarks in New York
List of New York State Historic Sites

References

External links

Knox's Headquarters State Historic Site (Official site)

Houses completed in 1754
New York (state) in the American Revolution
New York (state) historic sites
National Register of Historic Places in Orange County, New York
Tourist attractions in Orange County, New York
Palisades Interstate Park system
American Revolutionary War sites
Georgian architecture in New York (state)
New Windsor, New York
National Historic Landmarks in New York (state)
Museums in Orange County, New York
Houses in Orange County, New York
Historic house museums in New York (state)
Living museums in New York (state)
American Revolutionary War museums in New York (state)
1754 establishments in the Province of New York
Buildings and structures in New Windsor, New York